Vishnevsky liniment or balsamic liniment is a topical medication which has been used to treat wounds, burns, skin ulcers and suppurations. Developed by Russian surgeon Alexander Vishnevsky in 1927, the liniment contains birch tar, xeroformium (bismuth tribromophenolate) and castor oil which have been broadly used as a topical medication in the former Soviet Union.

Vishnevsky liniment was broadly used in the Soviet army during  World War II. It was later shown that a prolonged application of Vishnevsky liniment for chronic skin ulcers, wounds or burns can be associated with higher risk of skin cancer, hematologic or other malignancy.

References

Ointments
Abandoned drugs
Soviet inventions
Drugs in the Soviet Union